Mike Munoz may refer to:

Mike Munoz (baseball) (born 1965), baseball relief pitcher
Mike Muñoz (soccer) (born 1983), American soccer coach and former player

See also
Michael Muñoz, American gridiron football player
Miki Muñoz, Spanish football player